Black Peak is a prominent 6,385-foot (1,946-meter) glaciated mountain summit located in Lake Clark National Park and Preserve, in the Chigmit Mountains of the Aleutian Range, in the US state of Alaska. It is the second-highest non-volcanic peak in the Chigmit Mountains, and fourth-highest overall. Although modest in elevation, relief is significant since the mountain rises up 6,200 feet from North Fork Big River in about two miles. The mountain's descriptive name was published in 1912 by the United States Coast and Geodetic Survey. The months May through June offer the most favorable weather for viewing or climbing the peak.

Climate

Based on the Köppen climate classification, Black Peak is located in a subarctic climate zone, with long, cold, snowy winters, and cool summers. Temperatures can drop below −20 °C with wind chill factors below −30 °C. Precipitation runoff from the mountain and meltwater from its glaciers drains into Cook Inlet via Big River.

See also

List of the most prominent summits of the United States (149th)
List of mountain peaks of Alaska
Geography of Alaska

References

External links
 Weather forecast: Black Peak

Mountains of Alaska
Aleutian Range
Mountains of Kenai Peninsula Borough, Alaska
Lake Clark National Park and Preserve
North American 1000 m summits